The State Register of Heritage Places is maintained by the Heritage Council of Western Australia. , 107 places are heritage-listed in the City of Canning, of which eight are on the State Register of Heritage Places.

List
The Western Australian State Register of Heritage Places, lists the following eight heritage registered places within the City of Canning:

State Register of Heritage Places
State Register of Heritage Places in the City of Canning:

Heritage-listed places
Heritage-listed places in the City of Canning:

References

City of Canning
Canning